Cécile Bart, (born 1958 Dijon, Côte-d'Or), is a French painter and visual artist. She lives and works in Marsannay-la-Côte.

Life 
Cécile Bart enrolled in the École des Beaux-Arts of Dijon in September 1982, where she met French conceptual artist Sylvia Bossu. For her early work, she projected light on transparent sailing screens. The vocabulary of Cécile Bart is projection of color in places, transparent screens that receive and diffuse the light, with the visitor being part of the devices. Her works are created according to the space in which they are presented.

She uses as a manufacturing process a veil of Tergal that takes on a color with a brush. Depending on the number of layers, the color increases in intensity and becomes material. The veil is then stretched on an aluminum frame.

For Musée d'Art Contemporain du Val-de-Marne, she offered five color elements with as many frames. The visitor fits in the frame, so in the painting, and becomes surface that receives the color.

In 2004, Cécile Bart used fabric, for Toros, Lisses and Coulisses, sort of curtains alternating between open and closed. She also used the projection of films or photos.

In 2017, Cécile Bart offered silent show at the Centre de création contemporaine Olivier Debré. This time, she used for this installation, painting, cinema and dance. Dance sequences were projected on nine screens. The exhibition was silent. The bodies of the visitors mingle with the projected bodies. The image is split and set in motion. Here, the room is plunged into darkness. As in the previous works by Cécile Bart, natural light played an important role.

Public collections  
1% for the CASS (Health and Social Action Fund) of Ivry-sur-Seine, new construction of architects XTU Paris, 2008
Red painting, blue yard, Lycée Jean Vilar, Villeneuve-les-Avignon, 2007
The Two Ladies, installation, 2005, Dijon, Dijon Museum of Fine Arts
And rain, the sun, Maison d'enfants l'Arc-en-Ciel, Thiers, New Sponsors program of the Fondation de France, 2001-2003
Accompanying Painting, Saint-Joseph and Saint-Luc Hospital, Lyon, 1998-2001
Painting / screen under glass, University Library Nancy II, 1995
Profiles (3), consisting of five square format frames, Frac Bretagne, 2001

Exhibitions 
 2010
 The hypothesis of the lost ground, Cécile Bart, Concrete art space, Mouans castle, Mouans-Sartoux (Alpes-Maritimes)
 Opening, poetics of the various: Rennes (France), Frac Bretagne, 5 July 2012 – 8 July 2012
 2013
 Engine, seven transparent screen paintings suspended from the vaults of the chapel Jeanne d'Arc in Thouars.
 2017
 Silent show, CCCOD, Tours

 2018-2019 
 Winter effect, FRAC Bretagne, Rennes
 2020
 Rose Gold, FRAC Franche-Comté, Besançon

References

Sources 
 9 paren,1996, Livre-objet.  (Livre d'artiste)
 Cécile Bart. Plein Jour, Les presses du réel, collection Art contemporain, Dijon, 2008, 
 Cécile Bart,  Et pluie le soleil!, art3 (Valence), 2007,

External links 
 Official site
 Œuvres de Cécile Bart au Frac Bretagne

1958 births
21st-century French painters
20th-century French painters
Living people